Charles Newell Carter Jr. (born May 9, 1967) is a Democratic politician from North Carolina who served two terms in the North Carolina General Assembly.

Carter was born in Asheville, North Carolina and graduated from Asheville School. He earned a bachelor's degree in international studies and history from Oglethorpe University, after which he taught in the public schools of Buncombe County. In 1996, he ran unsuccessfully for the North Carolina Senate in the 28th Senate District.  In 1998 and 2000, Carter was elected to the Senate, and he served through 2002.

More recently, he opened several Port City Java cafes in the Asheville area. In May, 2007, Charles Carter broke away from the Port City Java corporation and created a locally owned chain of cafes known as Mountain Java. Mountain Java is now closed.

Carter also serves on the advisory board of the North Carolina DonorsChoose organization.

References

1967 births
Living people
Oglethorpe University alumni
North Carolina state senators
21st-century American politicians